In enzymology, an ATP diphosphatase is an enzyme that catalyzes the chemical reaction

ATP + H2O  AMP + diphosphate

Thus, the two substrates of this enzyme are ATP and H2O, whereas its two products are AMP and diphosphate.

This enzyme belongs to the family of hydrolases, specifically those acting on acid anhydrides in phosphorus-containing anhydrides.  The systematic name of this enzyme class is ATP diphosphohydrolase (diphosphate-forming). Other names in common use include ATPase, ATP pyrophosphatase, adenosine triphosphate pyrophosphatase, and ATP diphosphohydrolase [ambiguous].  This enzyme participates in purine metabolism and pyrimidine metabolism.

References

 
 

EC 3.6.1
Enzymes of unknown structure